Chinchuba (also Ozone Park) is an unincorporated community in St. Tammany Parish, Louisiana, United States.

The community is on U.S. Route 190 just northwest of Mandeville.

Etymology
The name is derived from the Choctaw word Hachunchuba which means alligator in the Choctaw language.

Notes

Unincorporated communities in St. Tammany Parish, Louisiana
Unincorporated communities in Louisiana